Mohab Said (born 11 August 1987) is an Egyptian football midfielder who plays for Egyptian Premier League club Ismaily.

References

1987 births
Living people
Egyptian footballers
Association football midfielders
Wadi Degla SC players
Ismaily SC players
Al Ittihad Alexandria Club players
Petrojet SC players
Al Masry SC players
Aswan SC players
El Mansoura SC players